The 2003–04 season was the 103rd season in the existence of Amiens SC and the club's third consecutive season in the second division of French football. In addition to the domestic league, Amiens SC participated in this season's editions of the Coupe de France and the Coupe de la Ligue.

Players

First-team squad

Transfers

In

Out

Pre-season and friendlies

Competitions

Overall record

Ligue 2

League table

Results summary

Results by round

Matches

Coupe de France

Coupe de la Ligue

References

Amiens SC seasons
Amiens